The G-Force GF09 is a racing car developed and produced by American manufacturer Élan Motorsport Technologies for Panoz, with original work having been performed by G-Force Technologies prior to its purchase by Panoz, for use in the IndyCar Series. A subsequent version that saw the greatest usage in IndyCar racing was the G-Force GF09B with the Panoz GF09C following.

GF09's last appearance was in practice for the 2008 Indianapolis 500 when Phil Giebler, who drove for American Dream Motorsports, crashed his Panoz chassis and failed to qualify. Panoz effectively discontinued their IndyCar Series involvement after 2008 season due to all IndyCar Series teams opting for the Dallara IR-05 chassis and Panoz concentrated on sports car endurance racing.

Complete IndyCar Series results 

(key) (Results in bold indicate pole position; results in italics indicate fastest lap)

External links
Élan Motorsport Technologies official website
Panoz Auto Development official website

Panoz vehicles
IndyCar Series
Open wheel racing cars